Karindara is a small village in the Martung tehsil of Shangla District, Khyber Pakhtunkhwa, Pakistan. It is situated about 5 km north-east of Koozkalai Martung on a jeep track between Chakesar and Martung.

Villages in Shangla District